Juan Francisco Rivera Bedoya (born 16 May 1942) is a Mexican politician affiliated with the Institutional Revolutionary Party. As of 2014 he served as Deputy of the LX Legislature of the Mexican Congress representing Nuevo León.

References

1942 births
Living people
Politicians from San Luis Potosí
Institutional Revolutionary Party politicians
21st-century Mexican politicians
People from Matehuala
Autonomous University of Nuevo León alumni
Deputies of the LX Legislature of Mexico
Members of the Chamber of Deputies (Mexico) for Nuevo León